A foot-launched powered hang glider (FLPHG), also called powered harness, nanolight, or hangmotor, is a powered hang glider harness with a motor and propeller in pusher configuration. An ordinary hang glider is used for its wing and control frame, and the pilot can foot-launch from a hill or from flat ground, needing a length of about a football field to get airborne, or much less if there is an oncoming breeze and no obstacles.

History

Adding propulsion 

While powered microlights (ultralights) developed from hang gliding in the late 1970s, they were also a return to the type of low-speed aircraft that were common in the earlier years of aviation, but which were superseded as both civil and military aircraft pursued more speed. For a second time in aviation history, during the 1970s, motorization of simple gliders, especially those portable and foot-launched, became the goal of many inventors and gradually, small wing-mounted power packs were adapted. These early experiments went largely unrecorded, even in log books, let alone the press, because the pioneers were uncomfortably aware that the addition of an engine made the craft liable to registration, airworthiness legislation, and the pilot liable to expensive licensing and probably, insurance. Inventors from Australia, France and England produced several successful microlight motor gliders in the early 1970s  and very few were portable wings.

Don Mitchell
Surprisingly, what really launched the powered ultralight aviation movement in the United States was not the Rogallo flexible wing but a whole series of rigid-wing motorized hang gliders. The Icarus V flying wing appeared with its tip rudders and swept-back style wing was used as a base for some powered experiments.  Differently, a rigid biplane designed also by teenager Taras Kiceniuk Jr., the Icarus II was a foundation for a modification in Larry Mauro's UFM Easy Riser biplane that started to sell in large numbers; Larry Mauro would power his tail-less biplane; one version was solar powered, called the Solar Riser.  Hang gliding record holder Don Mitchell fitted his Mitchell Wing B-10 with a motor, though the pilot still had to use their legs as undercarriage, an arrangement which persisted until he designed the B-10 Mitchell Wing.

Barry Palmer

In 1963, and during his free time, aeronautical engineer Barry Palmer built and experimented with a foot-launched powered hang glider at Bloomfield, Connecticut. However, the engine was quite underpowered and the craft could not achieve flight. It is now estimated that a modern flexible Rogallo wing hang glider requires at least  at the prop shaft and about 45 lbf (200 N) of thrust just to maintain level flight. During 1967, Barry Palmer built what is likely the first weight-shift powered trike aircraft.

John Moody

On March 15, 1975, John Moody successfully added a  West Bend engine with a 71 cm (28 in) propeller to an UFM Easy Riser biplane hang glider designed by Larry Mauro. Moody opened the throttle and ran until he lifted from the frozen surface of a lake west of Racine, Wisconsin, and he flew for 30 minutes.    Then on July 27, 1976, John Moody demonstrated ultralight aviation at the annual EAA fly-in convention in Oshkosh, Wisconsin, with a foot launched McCulloch 101 powered Icarus II  in front of thousands of spectators, starting the modern ultralight aviation revolution in the United States. Later, he added wheels to the aircraft and by the end of 1979, there were almost 100 competing companies selling powered ultralights (microlights) but very few were foot-launchable.

Jerzy Kolecki
In 1979, a powered backpack called the Motolotnia - White Eagle, designed by Jerzy Kolecki, became available for sale. It consisted of a 90 cc McCulloch chainsaw engine with a direct drive 61 cm (24") wooden prop, producing a quoted 77 lbf (340 N) of thrust; the rate of climb was about 150 ft/min (0.76 m/s) and flight duration was limited by the small fuel tank and engine overheating after several minutes.

Other powered harnesses to reach the market in the 1980s were The Ranger and the Relax 220.

Others

By 2008, there were a few harness designs similar to the Swedish Aerosport Mosquito,  each sporting unique strengths, and produced by other FLPHG manufacturers. The latest generation of powered harnesses bear names such as Wasp, Flylight Doodle Bug, Raven, X1, Zenon, Airtime Explorer, Fillo, and Flyped.

World records
La Fédération Aéronautique Internationale (FAI) is the international standard-setting and record-keeping body for aeronautics and astronautics, so it also oversees the official records by foot-launched powered hang gliders, currently under the RWF1 category.

Unofficial Records
Unofficial FLPHG World Records - Confirmed but not validated by the FAI.

May 9. 1978, David Cook becomes the first pilot to cross the English Channel while flying on a foot-launched powered hang glider; he used a VJ 23F glider.

Three months later, on August 25 through 28, inspired by the film "Those Magnificent Men in their Flying Machines" and sponsored by British Airways, Breen flew his powered hang glider from London to Paris: Wishing to use a British made aircraft, Gerry Breen and Steve Hunt set about building with their version of the powered Soarmaster, but had no clutch. The unit, including glider, was considerably heavier than the Soarmaster and Olympus glider combination but the wing was much more robust. The hang glider was a Hiway Super Scorpion with a  McCulloch 125 cc engine mounted on the keel just forward of the hang strap. The journey was plagued with mechanical failures but Breen overcame them and completed the trip.
 In July 2002, Italian hang gliding champion and conservationist, Angelo d'Arrigo, guided a flock of 10 endangered western Siberian cranes, bred in captivity, with an Icaro hang glider equipped with an NRG powered harness  from the Arctic circle in Siberia, across Kazakhstan to the shores of the Caspian Sea in Iran, avoiding Afghanistan and Pakistan where they fall victim to the abundant guns. For the most part, he relied on the sun and wind for propulsion in order to teach the young cranes to soar long distances. This $250,000 USD experiment lasted for six months and finished in winter 2002.

 On May 24, 2009, Irish pilot Patrick Laverty broke the foot-launched powered hang glider altitude world record. He used an Aeros Discus 15  hang glider coupled to a supine custom-made harness equipped with a 29 hp ROS 125 engine with the Supa-Tuna tuning lights system on a WB32 carburettor. Takeoff was at sea level and he flew to an altitude of  ASL over Talybont, Ceredigion, Wales, UK. He carried oxygen and 10 litres of fuel, per U.K. regulations; his variometer indicated 30 to 50fpm climb rate at the time fuel ran out.

Systems

Currently, there are two harness configurations: prone (face down) and sitting. Both configurations allow the pilot to takeoff and land on their feet. Foot-launched powered hang glider (FLPHG) harnesses are built around a light metal frame with the engine and propeller mounted on the rear in a pusher configuration. Most powered harnesses in production are equipped with the Radne Raket 120 two stroke engine which is based on Husqvarna XP3120 chainsaw parts. For heavy pilots or pilots operating from higher than  MSL fields, a powered harness equipped with an  engine is recommended.

Electric motors 

 Richard Kruger-Sprengel (Helix Propeller) and German designer Werner Eck, have produced at least two electric powered paraglider (EPPG) prototypes,

Timeline for electric-powered foot-launched gliders
 1979 April 29: at Flabob Airport, California, Larry Mauro flew the Solar Riser with an electric motor powered by storage batteries charged from the sun.  The Solar Riser was a modified Easy Riser hang glider.
 2001  Richard Kruger Sprengel electric drive for paraglider.
 2006, June 6: in Canada, Casaba Lemak takes off using an electric paraglider.
 2006, December 19: Prototype electric paramotor from Helix-Carbon GmbH shows electric motor during the Coupe Icare in Saint Hilaire, France.
 2007 at the German Free Flight Trade Fair in Garmisch-Partenkirchen, Werner Eck and Jochen Geiger displayed electric drives for hang gliders and paragliders.
2007 Razeebus Aircraft
 The E-Lift hang glider system by Toni Roth, Fronreute, Germany 
 2009  E-flight Expo displayed some electric paragliders.

Patents
 US Patent 4262863 Filed: January 16, 1978.  Powered hang glider with reduction drive  by Charles J. Slusarczyk.
 US Patent 4417707  Filed: January 26, 1982.  Human powered hang glider by Ken Leong. This type of powered hang glider is powered by the muscle exertion of the hang glider pilot. This patent references earlier teachings affecting powered hang glider design.
 US Patent 5170965  Filed: April 30, 1991.  Hang glider which can fly by human strength by Hiroaki Yasuda.

See also

References

Hang gliding
Air sports
Powered hang gliders

pt:Asa delta